Yelpachikha is a rural locality (a selo) and the administrative center of Yelpachikhinskoye Rural Settlement, Bardymsky District, Perm Krai, Russia. The population was 1,341 as of 2010. There are 27 streets.

Geography 
Yelpachikha is located 19 km north of Barda (the district's administrative centre) by road. Konyukovo is the nearest rural locality.

References 

Rural localities in Bardymsky District